Benchmarking: An International Journal is a bimonthly peer-reviewed academic journal that publishes covers the field of quality management. The editor-in-chief is Angappa Gunasekaran (Dean and Professor, School of Business and Public Administration (BPA), California State University, Bakersfield). The journal was established in 1994 as Benchmarking for Quality Management & Technology and obtained its current name in 1999. It is currently published by Emerald Group Publishing. The journal is abstracted and indexed in Inspec, ProQuest databases, Web of Science, and Scopus.

Its CiteScore in 2018 is 2.80, and H index calculated by SCImago Journal Rank is 54, ranking in the Q1 (first quartile).

References

External links 
 

English-language journals
Business and management journals
Publications established in 1994
Bimonthly journals
Emerald Group Publishing academic journals